James Hubert King (August 27, 1932 – February 23, 2015) was an American professional baseball outfielder. He played in Major League Baseball (MLB) for 11 seasons between 1955 and 1967, mostly with the Washington Senators. He also was a member of the Chicago Cubs, St. Louis Cardinals, San Francisco Giants, Chicago White Sox and Cleveland Indians.

Career
King began his professional career in 1950 in the Cardinals' farm system, from which he was drafted by the Cubs as a Rule 5 selection in 1954. In the latter year, he was named the International League Most Valuable Player. That December, King was taken by the brand-new, replacement Washington franchise with the 50th overall selection in the 1960 Major League Baseball expansion draft.

During his major league career, King played in 1,125 games (796 as a Senator), batting .240 with 699 hits, 112 doubles, 19 triples, 117 home runs and 401 runs batted in. Notable games during his career include;
 On April 15, 1958, King played in the first major league game ever contested in California, as a member of the Giants against the Los Angeles Dodgers.
 On May 26, 1964, King hit for the cycle, playing for the Senators against the Boston Red Sox.
 On June 8, 1964, King had a three home run game, playing for the Senators against the Kansas City Athletics.

Personal life
King was born in Elkins, Arkansas. After his retirement from baseball, he returned to Arkansas and worked for a telephone company. He died in Elkins at the age of 82..

See also
 List of Major League Baseball players to hit for the cycle

References

Further reading

External links
, or Retrosheet

1932 births
2015 deaths
Baseball players from Arkansas
Chicago Cubs players
Chicago White Sox players
Cleveland Indians players
Fresno Cardinals players
International League MVP award winners
Leones del Caracas players
American expatriate baseball players in Venezuela
Major League Baseball outfielders
Omaha Cardinals players
People from Washington County, Arkansas
St. Louis Cardinals players
San Francisco Giants players
Phoenix Giants players
Toronto Maple Leafs (International League) players
Vernon Dusters players
Washington Senators (1961–1971) players
Winston-Salem Cardinals players